Emile Daems (born 4 April 1938) is a Belgian former professional road racing cyclist.

He began his professional career in 1959. Daems, rather small in stature, was very adept at sprinting.

In the 1962 Tour de France, he distinguished himself with three victories, first in Saint-Malo and then in Aix-en-Provence, each time solo. But it was especially during the mountainous 18th stage, between Juan-les-Pins and Briançon, that he impressed. Although he was mainly a classics rider, he managed to join the leading group on the col de l'Izoard (last climb of the day), twenty seconds behind Federico Bahamontes. He finally won in Briançon in a sprint of seven riders, ahead of Bahamontes, Jacques Anquetil, Raymond Poulidor and the yellow jersey Joseph Planckaert.

Major results

As Amateur
1956
1st  National Road Championships - Interclubs road race
2nd Brussels-Nivelles
1957
1st Hoeilaert-Louvain-Hoeilaert
1st Brussels-La Louvière-Brussels
1st Rund um den Sachsenring
3rd Rund um die Hainleite
1958
1st Overall Tour de Berlin
 Winner 4 stages
1st Overall GP Général Patton Juniors
1st GP Victor Bodson
1st Tour des Quatre-Cantons
1st Namur-Namêche
1st Bruxelles-La Louvière-Bruxelles
1959
1st Tour of Flanders indepentents

As Professional
1960
1st Giro di Lombardia
1st Giro dell'Appennino
1st Nationale Sluitingsprijs
1st Stages 9a and 19 Giro d'Italia
1st Stage 16 Roma–Napoli–Roma
1st Tour de l'Ouest
1st Trofeo Longines (TTT)
2nd Ronde van Brabant
3rd Heistse Pijl
3rd Six Days of Brussels (with Willy Vannitsen)
1961
 1st  Overall Giro di Sardegna
1st Stage 3 Tour de France
1st Giro del Ticino
1st GP Eugeen Roggeman 
1st GP Brabant Wallon 
3rd Grote Prijs Beeckman-De Caluwé
4th Tour of Flanders
1962
1st Milan–San Remo
1st Stage 2a Paris–Nice
13th Overall Tour de France
1st Stages 5, 16 and 18
2nd points classification
1st Stage 5 Giro di Sardegna
1st Giro del Ticino
1st Flèche Halloise
1st Omloop van Limburg
3rd Six Days of Brussels (with Emile Severeyns)
1963
1st  National Road Championships - Interclubs road race
1st Paris–Roubaix
1st Stages 5 and 7 Mi-Août en Bretagne
1st Vilvoorde- Houtem
1st Boucles Roquevairoises
3rd Brabantse Pijl
1964
1st Omloop der Zennevallei
2nd Gullegem Koerse
1965
1st  National Road Championships - Interclubs road race
1st Circuit du Tournaisis
2nd GP Stad Vilvoorde
3rd Grote Prijs Jef Scherens
3rd Tour of Leuven

References

External links

1938 births
Living people
Belgian male cyclists
Belgian Tour de France stage winners
People from Rixensart
Cyclists from Walloon Brabant